Religion is an important aspect of identity and society in Guyana. In 2012 the population was 63% Christian, 25% Hindu, 7% Muslim. Religions are reflected by East Indian, African, Chinese, and European ancestry, as well as a significant indigenous population. Members of all ethnic groups are well represented in all religious groups, with two exceptions: most Hindus are Indo-Guyanese, and nearly all Rastafarians are Afro-Guyanese people. Foreign missionaries from many religious groups are present. Christianity has historically been associated with Afro-Guyanese.

Practice of other beliefs make up 1% of the population, including the Rastafari movement, Buddhism, and the Baháʼí Faith. More than 3% of the population do not profess any religion. Between 1991 and 2012, Hinduism, Islam, Catholicism and Mainline Protestant churches all saw significant decline as the national population grew by 3%. This is in contrast to Pentecostalism, which more than doubled, and less-established Christian groups, which nearly quadrupled in the same period.

Religions

Christianity
The major groupings compose:
Pentecostal, 22.8% of the national population, increasing from 17% in 2002
Anglican, 5.2%, decreasing from 7%
Seventh-day Adventist, 5.4%, increasing from 5%
Roman Catholicism, 7.1%, decreasing from 8.1%
Other Christian groups, 20.8%, increasing from 17.9%

Christianity's status as Guyana's dominant system of values is a consequence of colonial history. To the European planters, colonial administrators, and missionaries, the profession of Christian beliefs and observance of Christian practices were prerequisites to social acceptance. Even though the planters discouraged the teaching of their religion to the slaves, Christianity eventually became as much the religion of the Africans as of the Europeans. Indeed, after abolition, Christian institutions played an even more important role in the lives of the former slaves than in the lives of the masters. By the time the East Indians and other indentured groups arrived in Guyana, a new syncretic Afro-Guyanese culture in which Christianity played an important part had already been established. Only since the mid-20th century, with the growth of the Indo-Guyanese population and the efforts of their ethnic and religious organizations, have Muslim and Hindu values and institutions been recognized as having equal status with those of Guyana's Christians.
Among the Christian denominations active in Guyana in the 1990s, the Anglican Church claimed the largest membership: about 125,000 adherents as of 1986 though this had declined to about 40,000 in 2012.  Anglicanism was the state religion of British Guiana until independence.

The Roman Catholic Church had a membership of about 94,000 in 1985 which declined to about 53,000 in 2012. The majority of Roman Catholics lived in Georgetown, and the Portuguese Guyanese were the most active members, although all the ethnic groups were represented.

The Presbyterian Church was the third largest denomination, with nearly 39,000 members in 1980.

Several other Christian churches had significant memberships in 1980, including the Methodists (1.4% of the population), Pentecostals, and Seventh-day Adventists (5% of the population), each of which had about 20,000 members. There were smaller numbers of Baptists, Jehovah's Witnesses (1.3% of the population), Congregationalists, Nazarenes, Moravians, Ethiopian Orthodox, and other mainstream Christians. Other sects in Guyana included the Rastafari movement (0.5% of the population) which looks to Ethiopia for religious inspiration, and the Alleluia church, which combines Christian beliefs with Amerindian traditions. 

About 20.8% (about 155,000) of the population describing themselves as Christian who had no formal church affiliation. Many rural villages and areas without churches have small gatherings with a group leader, sometimes unofficially called pastor without affiliation to a specific or official Christian church, though most tend to be Baptist or Evangelical in nature. These groups would have services, bible teachings and discussions at a neighbor's house or a provided empty location. Through organization, a village or a couple of villages might also provide Sunday School for children with a village member donating the space, many times the "bottom house", the empty space under a Guyanese house used for multiple purposes.

Hinduism

The number of Guyanese practising Hinduism has been decreasing for many decades now, with 185,000 people (24.8%) in 2012, 213,282 (28.4%) in 2002, and 253,065 (35.0%) in 1991. Its highest percentages are in Essequibo Islands-West Demerara and East Berbice Corentyne at 37.7% and 42.1% of the regional population respectively.
 
The majority of the East Indian immigrants were Hindu, and their dominant Status differences were attached and rituals varied. The hindus worshipped the classic pantheon of Vishnu and Shiva.  Hinduism remains the predominant religion of the Indo-Guyanese, although it has been considerably modified. Hinduism stresses the festivities accompanying religious rites. Festivals may last several days and are usually held in times of crisis or prosperity. Because the sponsor of a festival provides a tent and feeds a large number of guests, orthodox Hindu rituals require considerable outlays of money. A Hindu family has difficulty fulfilling ritual obligations unless it has accumulated a surplus of cash.

Since the late 1940s, reform movements have caught the attention of many Guyanese Hindus. The most important, the Arya Samaj movement (Aryan Society), was founded in India in 1875; the first Arya Samaj missionary arrived in Guyana in 1910.  The movement preaches monotheism and opposition to the use of images in worship as well as many traditional Hindu rituals.

Islam

Guyana's Muslims total 50,600 in Guyana, making up 6.8% of the national population. Essequibo Islands-West Demerara has the highest percentage of Muslims making up 11.8% of the region. They can be organized into orthodox and reform movements, and split into Shias, Sufis, Sunnis and Ahmadiyyas. The Sunnatul Jamaat is the orthodox Sunni Islamic movement. The largest Islamic organization in the country is the Guyana United Sadr Islamic Anjuman.

Baháʼí Faith 

The Baháʼí Faith is a relatively recent addition to the list of world religions represented in Guyana with the first local body (Local Spiritual Assembly) being established in Georgetown in 1955. National recognition came in 1976 when the National Spiritual Assembly of the Baháʼís of Guyana was incorporated by Act of Parliament. This body represents all Baháʼís in Guyana.

The 2002 Census enumerated 500 Baháʼís. In terms of religious practices and teachings, the Guyana Baháʼí community closely follows those of Baháʼí communities in other countries.

Judaism

Jews first came to Guyana in the 1660s, when Jewish settlers arrived in what was then the Dutch colony of Essequibo. Janet Jagan, an American-born Jewish woman, served as prime minister from March 17, 1997, to December 19, 1997, and as president of Guyana from December 19, 1997, to August 11, 1999.

Obeah
A number of folk beliefs continue to be practiced in Guyana. Obeah, a folk religion of African origin, incorporates beliefs and practices of all the immigrant groups. Obeah practitioners may be Afro-Guyanese or Indo-Guyanese, and members of all the ethnic groups consult them for help with problems concerning health, work, domestic life, and romance. Some villagers wear charms or use other folk practices to protect themselves from harm.

Comfa is an Afro-Guyanese religion.

Indigenous religions
Traditional Amerindians religious beliefs vary, but shamans play a significant role in all of them. The shaman is believed to communicate with the world of spirits in order to detect sorcery and combat evil. The shaman is also a healer and an adviser, the representative of the village to the spiritual world and sometimes its political leader as well. Missionary activity to the Amerindians has been intense. As a result, the traditional beliefs and practices of all the Amerindian groups have been modified; some have even disappeared.

House of Israel

The House of Israel was established by an American fugitive, David Hill, also known as Rabbi Edward Washington, who arrived in Guyana in 1972.  In the 1970s, the group claimed a membership of 8,000. The House of Israel had a daily radio program in which it preached that Africans were the original Hebrews. Opponents of the government claimed that the House of Israel constituted a private army for Guyana's ruling party, the People's National Congress (PNC).

During an anti-government demonstration, a House of Israel member murdered Roman Catholic priest Bernard Darke because he was on the staff of a religious opposition newspaper, the Catholic Standard. The House of Israel also engaged in strikebreaking activities and disruptions of public meetings. Critics of the government alleged that House of Israel members acted with impunity during the government of Forbes Burnham. However, under Desmond Hoyte, Burnham's successor, Rabbi Washington and key associates were arrested on a long-standing manslaughter charge, and sentenced to 15 years. Hill was released in 1992, and extradited to the United States. Hill died on 11 December 2005.

At the 2014 Walter Rodney inquiry, Joseph Hamilton, former priest of the House of Israel, testified that the House of Israel committed “oppressive and terrorizing acts on behalf of the PNC.” It was also revealed that the murderer of Walter Rodney was a member of the House of Israel.

Cults

Although not a Guyanese product, the country acquired international notoriety in November 1978 following a mass murder-suicide at Jonestown, the commune of the People's Temple of Christ, led by the Reverend Jim Jones, of Oakland, California. Guyana was chosen primarily for being socialist-leaning, as well as for being an English-speaking country.

Religion and politics
Through much of Guyana's history, the Anglican and Roman Catholic churches helped maintain the social and political status quo. The Roman Catholic Church and its newspaper, the Catholic Standard, were vocal opponents of the ideology of the People's Progressive Party (PPP) in the 1950s and became closely associated with the conservative United Force. However, in the late 1960s the Roman Catholic Church changed its stance toward social and political issues, and the Catholic Standard became more critical of the government. Subsequently, the government forced a number of foreign Roman Catholic priests to leave the country. By the mid-1970s, the Anglicans and other Protestant denominations had joined in the criticisms of government abuse. The Anglican and Roman Catholic churches also worked together, unsuccessfully, to oppose the government's assumption of control of church schools in 1976.

The Guyana Council of Churches was the umbrella organization for sixteen major Christian denominations. Historically, it had been dominated by the Anglican and Roman Catholic churches. The Guyana Council of Churches became an increasingly vocal critic of the government in the 1970s and 1980s, focusing international attention on its shortcomings. The conflict between the government and the Guyana Council of Churches came to a head in 1985, when members of the PNC-influenced House of Israel physically prevented the council from holding its annual meeting. Later that year, police searched the homes of the major Christian church leaders. The PNC maintained the support of a number of smaller Christian denominations, however.

In contrast to the most prominent Christian clergy, who maintained connections with international denominations, Hindu and Muslim leaders depended on strictly local support. For them, resistance to political pressure was more difficult. In the 1970s, the PNC succeeded in splitting many of the important Hindu and Muslim organizations into pro-PNC and pro-PPP factions.

Freedom of religion

The Constitution of Guyana provides for freedom of religion, and the Government generally respects this right in practice. The U.S. government could locate no reports of societal abuses or discrimination based on religious belief or practice during 2007, and prominent societal leaders took positive steps to promote religious freedom.

In September 2009, forty mainly U.S. citizen missionaries from the Church of Jesus Christ of Latter-day Saints were detained briefly. Subsequently the 100+ missionaries were ordered to leave the country within a month. In addition to its missionary work, the church owns approximately $2 million in property in Guyana, and cultivate farms in the country. Missionaries have worked in the country for more than 20 years.

Notes

References